Chonnettia Jones is an American geneticist and developmental biologist. She has served as the executive director of Addgene since 2022. Jones was previously the vice president of research at the Michael Smith Foundation for Health Research and the director of Insight & Analysis at the Wellcome Trust.

Education and career 
Jones is a geneticist and developmental biologist. She was a Ruth L. Kirschstein research fellow at Emory University where she researched developmental neurobiology while completing a Ph.D. in biochemistry, cell and developmental biology. Jones' dissertation 2005 was titled Molecular and functional characterization of mini-me, a dominant modifier of hedgehog in Drosophila eye development. Her doctoral advisor was Kevin Moses.

Jones was a professor at American universities before managing the Howard Hughes Medical Institute scientific research program at the Janelia Research Campus. She joined Wellcome Trust in 2012 to evaluate the impact of their funded grants. In January 2016, Jones became the director of insight and analysis at Wellcome. In January 2020, Jones was announced as the vice president of research at the Michael Smith Foundation for Health Research in British Columbia effective on April 14, 2020. On May 9, 2022, she became the executive director of Addgene.

Selected works

References

External links
 

Living people
Year of birth missing (living people)
American expatriates in England
American geneticists
American women geneticists
Developmental biologists
American women biologists
Emory University alumni
20th-century American women scientists
21st-century African-American women
21st-century African-American scientists
21st-century American women scientists
21st-century American biologists
African-American biologists
African-American women scientists